Dating Dead Men is a book written by Harley Jane Kozak and published by Doubleday (owned and operated by Penguin Random House) on 20 January 2004, which later went on to win the Anthony Award for Best First Novel in 2005.

References 

Anthony Award-winning works
American mystery novels
2005 American novels